Panatanian Island is an island in Papua New Guinea, part of the Calvados Chain within the Louisiade Archipelago.  It is located between Panangaribu and Panakrusima islands. 
It should not be confused with Pana Tinani, which is a different island in the east.

References

Uninhabited islands of Papua New Guinea